Roberto Gutiérrez Frías (born October 2, 1962) is a Mexican former professional wrestler and wrestling trainer, best known under the ring name El Dandy. He is the cousin of professional wrestler Juan Conrado Aguilar, known as El Texano, and the uncle of Aguilar's sons, who wrestle as El Texano Jr. and Súper Nova. While he had a retirement tour in 2014, Gutiérrez has wrestled most recently in March 2019. Gutiérrez has wrestled for most major Mexican promotions, including Consejo Mundial de Lucha Libre, Lucha Libre AAA Worldwide, Universal Wrestling Association, World Wrestling Association, and International Wrestling Revolution Group. In addition, he has worked for the US-based World Championship Wrestling as well as the Japanese Super World Sports and the International Wrestling Association of Japan.

During his career, starting in 1981, he has won a number of championships, including the CMLL World Middleweight Championship three times, the NWA World Light Heavyweight Championship, the NWA World Welterweight Championship twice, the Mexican National Featherweight Championship, Mexican National Light Heavyweight Championship twice, Mexican National Middleweight Championship, Mexican National Welterweight Championship, the WWA World Light Heavyweight Championship, and the WWA World Tag Team Championship Corazón de León. He was a part of a tag team known as Los Fabulosos with Silver King and a member of the Latino World Order group in World Championship Wrestling. A 2004 match against L.A. Park was voted "Match of the Year" by readers of Box y Lucha magazine.

Professional wrestling career
Gutiérrez began training for a wrestling career at the age of 14, training under Diablo Velazco in his hometown of Guadalajara, Jalisco. After five years of training he finally, but reluctantly, made his in-ring debut. Gutiérrez later stated that he was nervous for his debut in part because of his fear of the public. He opted to use the ring name "El Dandy", after several of the wrestlers in Guadalajara gave him the nickname due to his success with women. He made his debut as an enmascarado, or masked wrestler, teaming with Águila Solitaria against Black Indian and Chamaco Hernández. A local promoter asked Gutiérrez if he would prefer to wrestle unmasked instead, leading to Gutiérrez to lose the mask and wrestle without a mask on for the remainder of his career. At the time his family did not know he had become a professional wrestler, not until they saw him on TV against El Dorado. While the match was so well received that the fans in the arena threw money in the ring, Gutiérrez's parents were not enthused with his career choice at the time.

Empresa Mexicana de Lucha Libre / Consejo Mundial de Lucha Libre (1981–1998)
After showing his skills in Guadalajara, representatives from Empresa Mexicana de Lucha Libre (EMLL), Mexico's largest professional wrestling promotion invited him to Mexico City to work for EMLL. Gutiérrez credited Mocho Cota and Herodes for getting him to Mexico City and also helping him out. Early in his EMLL career, Gutiérrez had to wash clothes for several wrestlers to earn enough money for food.

El Dandy won his first Championship on July 31, 1982 as he defeated El Modulo to win the Mexican National Featherweight Championship. His 175-day reign ended when Pequeño Solin defeated him on January 22, 1983. Two weeks after losing the championship, El Dandy won his first lucha de apuestas ("bet match") against El Guerrero and, as a result, El Guerrero was shaved bald. In Lucha libre a Lucha de Apuestas victory is considered more prestigious than championship wins. The following year, on December 6, El Dandy defeated Gran Cochisse in a Lucha de Apuestas, continuing his rise up the ranks of CMLL. By late 1984 El Dandy began teaming with Fuerza Guerrera and Talisman on a regular basis, forming a trio known as Los Bravos ("The Brave"). Los Bravos defeated Los Destructores (Lemús II, Tony Arce, and Vulcano) in a lucha de apuestas, winning the mask of Lemus II and the hair of Arce and Vulcano). On September 1, 1985, EMLL decided to have El Dandy defeat Américo Rocca to win the Mexican National Welterweight Championship. A total of 77 days later, El Dandy won the NWA World Welterweight Championship, and, in the process, relinquished the lower ranking Mexican National title. His 141-day reign was ended by Javier Cruz, as part of a long-running storyline feud between the two. El Dandy regained the championship on August 24, holding it for 70 days before losing it to Américo Rocca.

On July 17, 1987, he defeated Kung Fu to win the NWA World Middleweight Championship. After his title win, El Dandy became involved in a storyline with another middleweight competitor, El Satánico. Kung Fu  regained the championship when El Satánico helped Kung Fu cheat to win the title as part of the build up to a Lucha de Apuestas match between the two. In the lead up to the anticipated match, El Dandy defeated Satánico to win the Mexican National Middleweight Championship on September 28. Weeks later El Satánico defeated El Dandy, making him the first wrestler to pin El Satánico in a lucha de apuestas match. El Dandy's reign as Mexican National Middleweight Champion lasted 112 days until Javier Cruz won the championship.

In June 1990, El Dandy defeated Ángel Azteca to become the NWA World Middleweight Champion for a second time, holding it for 61 days until Atlantis won the title from him. The storyline between El Dandy and El Satánico was once again brought to the forefront in late 1990, with El Dandy evening the score between them by defeating El Satánico as part of the 1990 Juicio Final supercard show. The following year, El Satánico defeated El Dandy in their third overall Lucha de Apuestas, followed by El Dandy winning at the CMLL 59th Anniversary Show, to even the score at two-all in Lucha de Apuestas matches. In 1992, EMLL changed its name to Consejo Mundial de Lucha Libre (CMLL; World Wrestling Council) and created various CMLL championships. After having won both the NWA World and Mexican National championships in the middleweight division, El Dandy defeated Negro Casas to claim the recently created CMLL World Middleweight Championship. His reign was ended by Bestia Salvaje on September 4, 1992. El Dandy regained the championship in December, with his second reign as CMLL World Middleweight Champion lasting until May 1993. El Dandy had a third reign that started on October 5 and lasted until February 22, 1994, when he lost it to Javier Llanes.

Next, El Dandy moved into the light heavyweight division, defeating Jaque Mate to win the NWA World Light Heavyweight Championship. In 1996, El Dandy won two lucha de apuestas matches, first winning the hair of Babe Face on August 1, and then Chicago Express on September 3. The following month, on October 15, El Dandy's 681-day reign as NWA World Light Heavyweight Champion was ended by Black Warrior. While 1996 started with success, it ended with a Lucha de Apuestas loss to El Hijo del Santo in the main event of the 1996 Juicio Final show. El Dandy later competed in a tournament for the vacant CMLL World Trios Championship. Teaming up with Héctor Garza and Vampiro Canadiense, the trio defeated Apolo Dantés, Gran Markus Jr., and Fuerza Guerrera in the first round, before losing to Bestia Salvaje, Scorpio Jr., and Zumbido in the semifinals of the tournament.

World Wrestling Association (1993, 2000–2001, 2007)
While working for CMLL, El Dandy also wrestled for the World Wrestling Association (WWA) in Tijuana, Baja California, as he was allowed to take independent bookings on days where he was not needed for CMLL shows. El Dandy and Corazón de León defeated Los Cowboys (El Texano and Silver King) to win the WWA Tag Team Championship on July 21, 1993. Their reign lasted 42 days before Los Cowboys regained the championship. El Dandy returned to WWA in 2000, teaming with Silver King to win the WWA World Tag Team Championship for a second time, defeating Los Brazos (Brazo de Oro and Brazo de Plata) on November 10, 2000. He would also defeat La Parka to win the WWA World Light Heavyweight Championship in early 2001. El Dandy ended up losing both championships on June 17, as Antifaz and La Parka won the tag team championship and Asterico won the light heavyweight title. El Dandy won the WWA World Tag Team Championship a third time, teaming up with Rey Misterio to claim the vacant title on August 27, 2007. The team later vacated the championship for undisclosed reasons.

World Championship Wrestling (1997–2000)

In 1997, El Dandy began working for the US-based World Championship Wrestling (WCW) along with a number of other Mexican wrestlers. His WCW televised debut took place on September 28, 1997, where he and Damian lost to nWo Japan representatives The Great Muta and Masahiro Chono. His first pay-per-view (PPV) show match was as part of the 60-man battle royal main event of WCW's annual World War 3 show. He would later unsuccessfully challenge fellow Mexican luchador Juventud Guerrera for the WCW World Cruiserweight Championship in January 1998. In his next PPV match, El Dandy, La Parka, Psicosis, and Silver King lost to Chavo Guerrero Jr., Juventud Guerrera, Lizmark Jr., and Super Caló at Souled Out.

For the 1998 Slamboree show, El Dandy was one of 15 wrestlers involved in a battle royal where the winner of the match would face Chris Jericho for the WCW World Cruiserweight Championship. During his introductions, Jericho referred to El Dandy as the "winner of the Lou Ferrigno look-a-like contest". Later that year, Dandy was a member of the Latino World Order, a group of Mexican wrestlers led by Eddie Guerrero. Shortly after Guerrero's real-life car accident on New Year's Day, however, the group was forced to disband by the reformed nWo. The following year, El Dandy lost to Lenny whom he challenged for the WCW World Cruiserweight Championship. One of El Dandy's most notable moments came, not from the ring but, from an interview Bret Hart made. The heel Hart had selected El Dandy as his opponent, leading interviewer Gene Okerlund to question why Hart had selected such an easy opponent. This led to Hart respond "Who are you to doubt El Dandy?" 

In early 2000, El Dandy and Silver King competed under the name Los Fabulosos. On March 21, 2000, Los Fabulosos defeated XS (Lane and Rave) in their first televised match under that name. They later ended up losing to Harlem Heat 2000 (Big T and Stevie Ray) in El Dandy's last match with WCW.

Mexican independent circuit (2000–2019)
Returning to Mexico, El Dandy generally worked for various independent promotions all over Mexico, mixed in with stints for IWRG and AAA. On October 15, 2004 he lost the Mexican National Light Heavyweight Championship to L.A. Park. Five months later, El Dandy regained the championship from L.A. Park. His second reign lasted 750 days until Vangelis won the title on April 15, 2007. In April 2009, El Dandy lost a match for the NWA Worlds Heavyweight Championship to titleholder Blue Demon Jr. Later that same year, El Dandy defeated El Signo in a 7-man steel cage lucha de apuestas match. The match also included El Fantasma, El Oriental, Super Muñeco, Villano III, and Villano IV, and saw El Dandy pin El Signo causing El Signo to be shaved bald after the match.

In 2014, El Dandy began his retirement tour, facing off against his longtime rival El Satánico in various local shows around the country. The longtime rivals split the first four matches between them, leading to "El Juicio Final" on May 18. EL Dandy won the match, which meant that El Satánico was shaved bald. 12 days later, in what was billed as his last match, El Dandy defeated Satánico one more time. While the 2014 tour was meant to be his retirement, El Dandy returned to the ring in 2015, working a CMLL match alongside Negro Casas, defeating El Satánico and Mr. Niebla. He would also work a limited schedule, with four matches in 2016, and one in both 2017 and 2019.

International Wrestling Revolution Group (2000–2004)
After returning from his stint in WCW, El Dandy began working for the Naucalpan-based International Wrestling Revolution Group (IWRG). His first IWRG match took place on July 6, 2000, and saw El Dandy, Ciclon Ramirez, Kato Kung Lee, and Super Parka lose to Bombero Infernal, Dr. Cerebro, Mosco de la Merced, and Super Crazy. On February 8, 2002, he challenged Scorpio Jr. for the IWRG Intercontinental Heavyweight Championship but lost the match. While in IWRG, he defended the Mexican National Light Heavyweight Championship on two occasions, once against Negro Casas on July 24, 2003, and later against Blue Panther on August 31, 2003. He was one of eight wrestlers who put his hair on the line in a multi-man Lucha de Apuestas match; Suicida lost the match and his hair. On March 18, 2007, El Dandy was involved in a steel cage match where both his light heavyweight championship and the IWRG Intercontinental Welterweight Championship were on the line. In the end Fantasma de la Ópera defeated Dr. Cerebro to win the IWRG title. His last match with the group took place a week later, where Damián 666, Misterioso Jr., and Villano III defeated El Dandy, El Sagrado, and Máscara Sagrada by disqualification.

AAA (2002–2003)
El Dandy began working for AAA, making his debut for the company on May 5, 2002. El Dandy, Perro Aguayo Jr. Máscara Sagrada, and Máscara Maligna faced off in a steel cage match where the last person in the ring would either be forced to unmask or have their hair shaved off. Neither Dandy nor Aguayo were involved in the finish, watching from outside of the ring as Máscara Maligna lost and was unmasked. Two weeks later, El Dandy defeated Perro Aguayo Jr. to win the Mexican National Light Heavyweight Championship. The storyline came to an end in the main event of the 2002 Verano de Escándalo show, where Dandy, Aguayo, Electroshock and El Zorro faced off in a four-way Lucha de Apuestas match. In the end, Perro Aguayo Jr. pinned El Dandy, forcing El Dandy to be shaved bald as a result. El Dandy's last match, a victory over El Hijo del Santo, took place on May 11, 2003.

Personal life
At one point, Gutiérrez suffered a serious back injury that left him unable to perform for three months. During this difficult time, Gutiérrez contemplated suicide on more than one occasion, especially as few of his fellow wrestlers kept in contact with him. He found solace in physical therapy and has since opened a full-time practice. In early 2020, he was mentioned as a new member of the Mexico City boxing and lucha libre commission, assisting the commission in enforcing their rules and statutes.

Reception
During El Dandy's days in EMLL, Wrestling Observer Newsletter founder Dave Meltzer stated that El Dandy was one of the "three best workers" in EMLL. In 1997, Pro Wrestling Illustrated (PWI) ranked him at #167 in their "top 500" for the year.  Writer Matt Farmer stated that El Dandy was "highly underrated" and that he had "phenomenal matches" with Perro Aguayo Jr. during their 2002 feud. His 2004 match against L.A. Park was voted the "Match of the year" by readers of Box y Lucha magazine.

Championships and accomplishments
AAA
Mexican National Light Heavyweight Championship (2 times)
Comision National de Box y Lucha
Mexican National Featherweight Championship (1 time)
Empresa Mexicana de Lucha Libre / Consejo Mundial de Lucha Libre
CMLL World Middleweight Championship (3 times)
Copa de Oro 1994 – with Apolo Dantés 
NWA World Light Heavyweight Championship (1 time)
NWA World Middleweight Championship (2 times)
NWA World Welterweight Championship (2 times)
Mexican National Middleweight Championship (1 time)
Mexican National Welterweight Championship (1 time)
Pro Wrestling Illustrated
Ranked #167 of the 500 best singles wrestlers in the 1997 edition of PWI 500
World Wrestling Association
WWA World Light Heavyweight Championship (1 time)
WWA World Tag Team Championship (3 times) – with Corazón de León, Silver King (1) and Rey Misterio

Luchas de Apuestas record

Notes

References

External links
El Dandy: Profile & Match Listing

1962 births
The Latino World Order members
Living people
Mexican male professional wrestlers
People from Tijuana
Professional wrestlers from Baja California
20th-century professional wrestlers
21st-century professional wrestlers
Mexican National Middleweight Champions
CMLL World Middleweight Champions
NWA World Light Heavyweight Champions
NWA World Middleweight Champions
NWA World Welterweight Champions
Mexican National Light Heavyweight Champions